William H. Detrick Gymnasium is a 2,654-seat multi-purpose arena in New Britain, Connecticut. It is home to the Central Connecticut State University Blue Devils men's and women's basketball teams and women's volleyball team.
In 2005 it received a new floor, the first since the facility opened in 1965. The Northeast Conference men's basketball tournament was held there in 1998, 2002, and 2007. The facility is named after Bill Detrick, who was head coach at CCSU for 29 years, compiling a school-record 468 wins.

History
In 2020–21, William H. Detrick Gymnasium celebrated its 55th season of Central Connecticut men's basketball.  The Blue Devils’ historic home court ranks as the oldest in the Northeast Conference and is the fifth-oldest NCAA Division I home venue in New England.
  Matthews Arena, Northeastern (1910)
  Payne Whitney Gymnasium, Yale (1932)
  Lundholm Gymnasium, New Hampshire (1938)
  Patrick Gymnasium, Vermont (1963)
  Detrick Gymnasium, Central Connecticut (1965)

Under head coach Bill Detrick, for whom the gymnasium is named, the Blue Devils christened their new home court with a 109–57 win over Coast Guard on December 4, 1965. Central's Bob Plosky scored the first points in the gym's history with a basket at the 19:30 mark of the first half. Gene Reilly, who ranks eighth all-time in scoring at CCSU with 1,597 points, led the way with 21 points in front of a then-record crowd of 3,600 fans. The Blue Devils went on to win their first 10 home games at their new home and posted a 23–3 overall record, which included a trip to the 1966 College Division Basketball Championship tournament.

Detrick Gymnasium is part of the Kaiser Hall athletic building, a modern and spacious gymnasium at the time it ushered Central Connecticut's men's basketball program from NAIA era to NCAA Division II. Built with a total capacity of 4,500, it was the second-largest on-campus basketball gym in New England when it opened in 1965.
  Greer Field House, Connecticut (4,604)
  Detrick Gymnasium, Central Connecticut (4,500)
  Curry Hicks Cage, Massachusetts (4,000)
  Keaney Gymnasium, Rhode Island (3,885)

See also
 List of NCAA Division I basketball arenas

References

External links
 Detrick Gymnasium

College basketball venues in the United States
College volleyball venues in the United States
Basketball venues in Connecticut
Sports venues in Hartford County, Connecticut
Central Connecticut Blue Devils men's basketball
1965 establishments in Connecticut
Sports venues completed in 1965